Five Live may refer to:

 Five Live (George Michael and Queen EP)
 Five Live (Toad the Wet Sprocket EP)
 BBC Radio 5 Live, a radio station